Rotgundspitze is a mountain of Bavaria, Germany. It is located in the main ridge of the Allgäu Alps mountain range.

Mountains of Bavaria
Mountains of the Alps